Parwayuni (Aymara parwayu blossom of cereals, -ni a suffix to indicate ownership, "the one with a cereal blossom (or cereal blossoms)", Hispanicized spelling Parhuayune) is a mountain in the Andes of Peru, about  high. It is in the Arequipa Region, Arequipa Province, Tarucani District, and in the Moquegua Region, General Sánchez Cerro Province, Ubinas District. Parwayuni is northwest of the active volcano Ubinas and the  Qhuyu Parwayuni.

References 

Mountains of Arequipa Region
Mountains of Moquegua Region
Mountains of Peru